The Mixed 3 m springboard synchro competition of the 2016 European Aquatics Championships was held on 11 May 2016.

Results
The final was held at 20:00.

References

Diving
European Aquatics Championships